Glauber Ramos da Silva (born 10 November 1974) is a Brazilian football coach, currently in charge of Grêmio Anápolis.

Career
Born in Gama, Federal District, Ramos had a short career as a player, and notably represented the reserve team of Palmeiras in 1993. After retiring, he worked at Brasiliense and Pires do Rio before meeting Augusto César at Brasília in 2009. The duo then worked together at Botafogo-DF, before Ramos became Marcos Soares' assistant at Brasiliense in 2011.

Ramos rejoined Augusto's staff at Gama in 2012, being later named coach of Goiás' under-18 squad while Augusto was in charge of the under-20s; as the under-18 category was not official, he became Augusto's assistant in the under-20s. In 2016, Ramos returned to Gama, being an assistant coach of Arthur Bernardes and Reinaldo Gueldini before being named interim coach for the last match of the 2017 Campeonato Brasiliense.

In September 2017, Ramos returned to Goiás, and was again Augusto's assistant. In August 2020, he was named interim coach of the main squad after the dismissal of Ney Franco.

After being interim for one match, Ramos returned to his previous role after the appointment of Thiago Larghi. In November, after Enderson Moreira was sacked, he was named Augusto's assistant in the main squad, but was the one who signed the match reports as head coach as Augusto did not have the Brazilian Football Confederation's A license to manage.

On 12 April 2021, Ramos was again named interim after Augusto was sacked. He was also an interim on two more occasions during the campaign, after the dismissals of Pintado and Marcelo Cabo, and led the side back to the Série A in December.

Ramos remained an interim for the start of the 2022 season, before returning to his previous role in late February after the appointment of Bruno Pivetti. In March, he was again interim after Pivetti sacked, but left the Esmeraldino on 14 April, shortly after the appointment of Jair Ventura as head coach. On 16 January 2023, he was named in head coach of Grêmio Anápolis.

Coaching statistics

References

External links

1974 births
Living people
Sportspeople from Federal District (Brazil)
Brazilian footballers
Sociedade Esportiva do Gama players
Sociedade Esportiva Palmeiras players
Brazilian football managers
Campeonato Brasileiro Série A managers
Campeonato Brasileiro Série B managers
Sociedade Esportiva do Gama managers
Goiás Esporte Clube managers
Grêmio Esportivo Anápolis managers
Association footballers not categorized by position